John Allen King (15 April 1938 – 30 March 2016) was an English football player and manager. He is widely regarded as being the most successful manager in the history of Tranmere Rovers, and had a stand at Prenton Park named in his honour in 2002. In November 2014, a statue of King was unveiled outside the ground.

He played at wing half, and made 411 league appearances in a 14-year career in the Football League. He began his career at Everton, playing for the club in the top-flight between 1957 and 1960. He then moved on to Tranmere Rovers via Bournemouth & Boscombe Athletic. He helped Rovers to win promotion out of the Fourth Division in 1966–67, before he signed with Port Vale in June 1968. He helped the "Valiants" to promotion out of the Fourth Division in 1969–70, before he joined non-league Wigan Athletic in May 1971.

He found more success as a manager than as a player, gaining his first management post at former club Tranmere Rovers in April 1975. He led the "Superwhites" to promotion out of the Fourth Division in 1975–76, before he was sacked in September 1980. He then had successful spells in charge at non-league clubs Northwich Victoria (winning the FA Trophy in 1984) and Caernarfon Town, before making his return to Tranmere Rovers in 1987. He immediately steered the club away from losing their Football League status, before taking them to promotion in 1988–89. He further took them to the Associate Members' Cup title in 1990, the Football League Trophy final in 1991, as well as promotion out of the Third Division as winners of the play-offs. His team narrowly missed out on promotion to the Premier League, reaching the play-offs three times between 1993 and 1995, also reaching the semi-finals of the League Cup. Despite these achievements, he was not immune to being replaced when the team's form dipped, and he was "moved upstairs" to become Director of football in April 1996.

Playing career
King started his career at Everton in 1957. He made 48 First Division appearances at Goodison Park under Ian Buchan and Johnny Carey over the course of the 1957–58, 1958–59, and 1959–60 campaigns. He then moved on to Bournemouth & Boscombe Athletic, playing 21 Third Division games under Don Welsh, before he joined Tranmere Rovers and being signed by Walter Galbraith. Rovers were relegated out of the Third Division in 1960–61. New manager Dave Russell led them to a 15th-place finish in the Fourth Division in 1961–62. They then reached eighth in 1962–63 and seventh in 1963–64, before finishing fifth in 1964–65, just one place and one point behind promoted Oxford United. They came even closer in 1965–66, finishing behind promoted Colchester United on goal average. Rovers finally achieved their goal in 1966–67, winning promotion in fourth place, they finished four points ahead of fifth place Crewe Alexandra. They then retained their third tier status in 1967–68, finishing two places above the relegation zone. Over eight years at Prenton Park, King made 264 appearances in all competitions.

He signed with Port Vale in June 1968. He made 46 appearances in 1968–69, helping Gordon Lee's "Valiants" to a 13th-place finish in the Fourth Division. He played alongside Roy Sproson in a team which was based around defence. He played in a goalless home draw with Swansea Town on 18 October 1969, despite having chickenpox at the time, and played a total of 41 games in the 1969–70 promotion season. King chipped his ankle bone in November 1970, and was sidelined for four months; therefore he could only play 27 games in 1970–71. He left on a free transfer to Northern Premier League side Wigan Athletic in May 1971, making 12 appearances in the 1971–72 campaign, his only season at Springfield Park.

Managerial career

Tranmere Rovers
King was first appointed as Tranmere Rovers manager in April 1975, and led his charges to promotion out of the Fourth Division in 1975–76. He stabilised the club in the Third Division in 1976–77, and another mid-table finish followed in 1977–78. However Rovers were relegated in 23rd place in 1978–79, finishing 12 points behind 20th place Chesterfield. Rovers then dropped to 15th in the bottom tier in 1979–80. King was sacked in September 1980, but new boss Bryan Hamilton could not prevent Tranmere finishing in the re-election zone in 1980–81.

Northwich Victoria
King moved on to Rochdale as a coach, before taking the reins at Northwich Victoria in October 1981. He took the club to sixth in the Alliance Premier League in 1981–82, eighth in 1982–83, and seventh in 1983–84. He took Victoria to Wembley in 1983, where they lost 2–0 to Telford United in the FA Trophy. They travelled to Wembley again for the FA Trophy final in 1984, though a 1–1 draw meant that a replay was held at the Victoria Ground in Stoke-on-Trent; Northwich then beat Bangor City 2–1 to take the trophy back to Drill Field. He also led the "Vics" to the Cheshire Senior Cup title in 1984.

Caernarfon Town
King took charge at Welsh club Caernarfon Town. At Northern Premier League side Caernarfon he was at the helm for some of the most successful seasons in the club's history, including the club's 1986–87 FA Cup run to the third round, recording victories over Football League sides Stockport County and York City.

Return to Tranmere Rovers
King was appointed manager of Tranmere for a second time by Peter Johnson towards the end of the 1986–87 season, with the club fighting to avoid relegation out of the Football League. Safety was only guaranteed in the last game of the season with a 1–0 home win over Exeter City. King signed Jim Steel to act as target man for striker Ian Muir. The move was inspired and the team enjoyed considerable success together in the seasons to follow. They rose to a mid-table finish in 1987–88, before winning promotion as Fourth Division runners-up in 1988–89. Tranmere then finished fourth in the Third Division in 1989–90, missing out on a second successive promotion after losing 2–0 to Notts County in the play-off final. They played at Wembley four times in two years, winning the Associate Members' Cup in 1990 with a 2–1 victory over Bristol Rovers. He led the "Superwhites" promotion with a 1–0 win over Bolton Wanderers in the 1991 play-off final, after Tranmere finished fifth in 1990–91. They also reached the Associate Members' Cup final for a second successive year, losing 3–2 to Birmingham City.

They finished a comfortable 14th in 1991–92, before hitting fourth in 1992–93. This qualified them for the play-offs, however they were beaten 5–4 on aggregate by Swindon Town at the semi-final stage. The club again narrowly missed out on promotion to the Premier League in 1993–94, losing to Leicester City in the play-off semi-finals. They also reached the semi-finals of the League Cup, losing to Aston Villa on penalties.

King brought such big name signings as John Aldridge, Pat Nevin and Gary Stevens to Prenton Park, but their crowds did not increase much and the club had to sell players such as Steve Vickers and Ian Nolan to survive. Tranmere nevertheless qualified for the play-offs for a third successive season in 1994–95, finishing fifth, before being beaten 3–1 by Reading at the play-off semi-final stage. In April 1996, with Rovers struggling for form in the league, chairman Frank Corfe appointed John Aldridge as player-manager, and King was "moved upstairs" to become Director of football. They finished the 1995–96 campaign in 13th position.

Career statistics

Honours

As a player
Tranmere Rovers
Football League Fourth Division fourth-place promotion: 1966–67

Port Vale
Football League Fourth Division fourth-place promotion: 1969–70

As a manager
Tranmere Rovers
Football League Fourth Division fourth-place promotion: 1975–76
Football League Fourth Division second-place promotion: 1988–89
Associate Members' Cup: 1990; runner-up 1991
Football League Third Division play-offs: 1991

Northwich Victoria
FA Trophy 1984; runner-up 1983
Cheshire Senior Cup: 1984

Recognition by Tranmere Rovers
The former Borough Road stand at Tranmere Rovers' ground, Prenton Park, was renamed the Johnny King Stand in 2002. On 1 November 2014, a bronze statue of King, designed by artist Tom Murphy, was unveiled outside the ground   by King himself before the club's home match against Stevenage. Ben Harrison of the Tranmere Rovers Supporters Club said that "Johnny King is the club's greatest ever manager and is rightly revered by every Tranmere supporter. A loyal servant as both player and manager, the unparalleled success and style of football played by his teams as we rose from near oblivion to the verge of the Premier League will always be fondly remembered at Prenton Park."

References

1938 births
2016 deaths
Footballers from Marylebone
English footballers
Association football midfielders
Everton F.C. players
AFC Bournemouth players
Tranmere Rovers F.C. players
Port Vale F.C. players
Wigan Athletic F.C. players
English Football League players
Northern Premier League players
English football managers
Tranmere Rovers F.C. managers
Northwich Victoria F.C. managers
Caernarfon Town F.C. managers
English Football League managers
National League (English football) managers
Northern Premier League managers
Association football coaches
Rochdale A.F.C. non-playing staff